Chinlac is the site of a former Dakelh (Carrier) village on the West bank of the Stuart River about 1 km upstream from its junction with the Nechako River. Oral tradition considers it to have been one of the major Carrier settlements. The site is strategically located at a shallow point in the river where a weir could easily be used to harvest running salmon.  The remain of the weir can still be seen from the meadow.

Chinlac is an anglicization of Carrier Chunlak, itself a contraction of duchun nidulak - "logs customarily float to a point", which describes the way in which driftwood accumulates in the shallows where the weir was built.

According to oral tradition, the village was destroyed around 1745 by Chilcotin raiders from Nazko, on the Nazko River. (Although Nazko is now a Carrier village, it was Chilcotin at the time.)  The meadow contains the traces of 13 lodges. In the surrounding bush are the remains of hundreds of cache pits.

One lodge site was excavated in 1951-1952 by a team led by Charles Edward Borden. Among other things, he found a Song dynasty (960-1127 CE) Chinese coin, indicating the existence of trade with the Pacific Coast if not Asia prior to European contact.

References

External links
Vancouver Sun article

Archaeological sites in British Columbia
Dakelh communities
Former populated places in British Columbia